Paul Ruto (born November 3, 1960) is a former Kenyan 800 metres runner who won a gold medal at the 1993 World Championships in Stuttgart. Ruto took the lead in the first lap and kept it until the end. He was used to front-running, as earlier in his career, he had been employed as a pacemaker at international meetings.

External links

1960 births
Living people
Kenyan male middle-distance runners
World Athletics Championships medalists
Goodwill Games medalists in athletics
World Athletics Championships winners
Competitors at the 1994 Goodwill Games